One Precious Year is a 1933 British drama film directed by Henry Edwards and starring Anne Grey, Basil Rathbone and Owen Nares. It was made at British and Dominion Elstree Studios by the British producer Herbert Wilcox for release by the British subsidiary of Paramount Pictures. The film's sets were designed by the art director C. Wilfred Arnold.

Cast
 Anne Grey as Dierdre Carton  
 Basil Rathbone as Derek Nagel  
 Owen Nares as Stephen Carton  
 Flora Robson as Julia Skene  
 Evelyn Roberts as Mr. Telford  
 H.G. Stoker as Sir John Rome  
 Robert Horton as Dr. Hibbert  
 Violet Hopson as Woman at Party  
 Jennie Robins as Specialty  
 Western Brothers as Speciality 
 Ben Webster as Sir Richard Pakenham  
 Ronald Simpson 
 Olga Slade

References

Bibliography
 Chibnall, Steve. Quota Quickies: The Birth of the British 'B' Film. British Film Institute, 2007.
 Low, Rachael. Filmmaking in 1930s Britain. George Allen & Unwin, 1985.
 Wood, Linda. British Films, 1927-1939. British Film Institute, 1986.

External links

1933 films
British drama films
1933 drama films
Films directed by Henry Edwards
Quota quickies
British black-and-white films
British and Dominions Studios films
Films shot at Imperial Studios, Elstree
Paramount Pictures films
1930s English-language films
1930s British films